Adelie or Adélie may refer to:

 Adélie Land, a claimed territory on the continent of Antarctica
 Adelie Land meteorite, a meteorite discovered on December 5, 1912, in Antarctica by Francis Howard Bickerton
 Adélie penguin, a species of penguin common along the entire coast of the Antarctic continent
 Adélie Valley, a drowned fjord on the continental margin of East Antarctica